The 1908–09 Swiss National Ice Hockey Championship was the first edition of the national ice hockey championship in Switzerland. Eight teams participated in the championship, which was won by HC Bellerive Vevey, who finished first in the standings.

Final standings

External links 
Swiss Ice Hockey Federation – All-time results

National
Swiss National Ice Hockey Championship seasons
Nat